Old Rottenhat is the fourth studio album by Robert Wyatt.  It was released in November 1985, and in 1993 it was reissued in its entirety as part of the CD Mid-Eighties. The album was produced and performed solo by Wyatt, and is dedicated to Michael Bettaney, a UK MI5 intelligence officer who in 1984 was convicted for acting as an agent-in-place for the Soviet Union.

Track listing
All songs written by Robert Wyatt

Side one
"Alliance" – 4:24
"The United States of Amnesia" – 5:50
"East Timor" – 2:52
"Speechless" – 3:37
"The Age of Self" – 2:50
"Vandalusia" – 2:44

Side two
"The British Road" – 6:23
"Mass Medium" – 4:43
"Gharbzadegi" – 7:54
"P.L.A." – 2:31

Personnel 
 Robert Wyatt: vocals, piano, keyboards, bass, percussion

Recording details
Recorded in 1984 at West 3 Studios, Acton, London, by John McGowan.
Recorded in 1985 at Acre Lane Studios, Brixton, by Bill Gilonis.
"Thanks to Charles Gray and Vicky Aspinall for invaluable help and advice and thanks Duncan".

Album cover
The artwork for the album cover was created by Wyatt's wife Alfreda Benge.

References

External links

1985 albums
Robert Wyatt albums
Rough Trade Records albums